Henry Schmidt may refer to:

 Henry Schmidt (American football) (1935–2021), American football defensive tackle
 Henry Schmidt (baseball) (1873–1926), baseball pitcher
 Henry C. Schmidt (born 1937), associate professor of history at Texas A&M University